Benassal is a municipality in the comarca of Alt Maestrat, Castellón, Valencia, Spain.

Municipalities in the Province of Castellón
Alt Maestrat
Maestrazgo